MFI Group Limited was a British furniture retailer, operating under the MFI brand. The company was one of the largest suppliers of kitchens and bedroom furniture in the United Kingdom, and operated mainly in retail parks in out of town locations. Anecdotally, it was said at one stage that one in three Sunday lunches in the United Kingdom were cooked in a kitchen from MFI, and 60% of British children were conceived in a bedroom from MFI.

After success in its early decades, it experienced recurring financial problems accompanied by several changes of ownership, and on 26 November 2008, it was announced that the business had been placed into administration. Merchant Equity Partners, headed by Henry Jackson, was the last company to own it, before it was sold to the management in September 2008 for a "small profit".

The business ceased trading by 19 December 2008, after the administrators failed to find a buyer.

It struggled to make profits during the 2000s, as chains such as B&Q and Argos introduced their own furniture lines, and rival chain IKEA (who arrived in the United Kingdom in the second half of the 1980s) expanded. Following its closure, the MFI brand was purchased by Victoria Plumb, and was relaunched as an online only retailer on 30 November 2011 only for it to cease trading again in July 2015.

Following a rebrand in 2015, Victoria Plumb became VictoriaPlum.com and announced that it was to expand into other home product categories. As part of this expansion, VictoriaPlum.com announced on 17 March 2016 that it was set to revive the MFI brand name, to represent its exclusive collection of low cost, value for money bedroom furniture.

History

The MFI Retail business was founded in 1964 as Mullard Furniture Industries by two British men, Noel Lister and Donald Searle, who previously traded in war surplus goods. It was named after Searle's wife's maiden name. The company became a public company in 1971, as MFI Warehouses (the Group). An external manager, Derek Hunt, was recruited soon afterwards.

In 1982, owners of Hygena, Norcros, were looking to dissolve the company and sell the Hygena name. This was purchased jointly in 1982 by MFI Group and Malcolm Healey's company; Humber Kitchens.

In the 1980s, the group entered into partnerships, notably in 1985 with Asda. The Asda connection was soon dissolved over concerns about the company's future, and there was a management buy-out in October 1987. Also in MFI took full control of Hygena in 1987, buying Healey out for £200 million. In November 1988, MFI acquired Schreiber Furniture.

With the advent of out of town shopping during the 1980s, MFI Retail opened a host of stores in such developments. In 1985, it was the very first tenant of the Merry Hill Shopping Centre at Brierley Hill in the West Midlands, opening a new store, which within four years, was part of the largest shopping complex in Western Europe.

MFI Retail gained a new rival in October 1987, when Swedish furniture retailer IKEA began trading in Britain, and expanded over the coming years. Soon afterwards, DIY retail giant B&Q expanded into the furniture market, and emerged as a surprise new rival for the business. Despite this, the MFI Group was still expanding in November 2002, when it took over Sofa Workshop.

During 2004 to 2005, serious and highly publicised IT problems affecting customers damaged MFI Retail's credibility, and the finance director and chief operating officer left the Group.

By 2005, it was clear that MFI Retail's fortunes were declining. Despite the British economy still being strong and recession not even on the horizon, it was reported that sales for 2005 had fallen to £742 million compared to £854 million in 2003. In September 2006, the MFI Retail business was acquired by Merchant Equity Partners for £1 after which the parent company changed its name to Galiform.

In December 2006, Argos overtook MFI as the United Kingdom's largest furniture retailer. MFI Retail was the subject of a second management buyout in September 2008, but by this stage the British economy was sliding into recession, unemployment was rising and retail sales were falling. MFI's future was looking bleak.

Early on 25 November 2008, the BBC first reported the possibility of MFI Retail going into administration, with MFI desiring a three-month rent free period from landlords. Later the following day, it was announced that no agreement could be reached and PropertyWeek reported that Menzies Corporate Restructuring had been appointed as administrators.

On 26 November 2008, after a board meeting MFI went into administration. The company was unable to confirm what would happen to consumers with pending orders. On 19 December 2008, all 111 MFI stores were closed with the loss of 1,200 jobs.

Operations
Home deliveries amounted for over fifty million items a year, going to 2.5 million households in Great Britain and Northern Ireland.

The business had sought to upgrade many aspects of its operations, including greater focus on customer service; updating and improving the product range; improving utilisation of floor space; establishing closer supplier relationships; investing in logistics, IT, supply systems and product development and enhancing internal communications.

It offered a full range of furniture for bedrooms, bathrooms, kitchens, lounges, dining rooms and home offices. It was particularly associated with self assembly furniture. Its products were mainly targeted to value oriented customers with the "Hygena" brand, and those on a higher income with the "Schreiber" brand. MFI was also one of the largest suppliers of installed appliances in the United Kingdom with its own brand "Diplomat".

New and exclusive to MFI was its "Space Genie" range which were ingenious storage solutions for the kitchen and bedroom. MFI sold beds directly from Silentnight, Rest Assured and Layezee, and also sold dining furniture from The Chair Company. Other MFI brands included "Viva Sofa" and "The Bath Co."

Criticisms
MFI Retail had been criticised for the excessive frequency and length of its sales. In a six-month survey by consumer magazine Which?, it emerged that four out of five kitchens in the "sale" had never actually been sold at the higher price against which the discount claims were being made.

Which? stated that "MFI's pricing policy deceived its customers into thinking they are getting a better deal than they are. In some cases, its pricing is downright misleading". MFI's advertising of such sales also came in for criticism for using phrases such as "Hurry! Only four days left" or "Prices too good to last" even though a new sale would almost always be launched immediately afterwards.

MFI Retail was also known for being one of the first ever companies to be investigated by the BBC programme Watchdog. The programme attempted to buy a £600 kitchen advertised by MFI, though the price only actually included kitchen units and not the appliances shown. When the Watchdog crew arrived at a branch of the company, they were immediately confronted by a manager who evicted them from the store.

Controversies
In September 2007, MFI Retail was forced to withdraw a television advert featuring a woman slapping her husband in the face twice and shouting at him for leaving the toilet seat up. Those complaining felt that the advert trivialised the issue of domestic violence against men. The ASA concluded that it "was likely to cause serious or widespread offence to viewers and could be seen to condone intimidation, domestic violence and aggression as an acceptable way to resolve issues".

The ASA went as far as to state that "it could also cause social, moral or psychological harm to children" and they were "concerned that it had been broadcast at all". As a result, the advertisement was banned.

Notes

References

External links

Companies formerly listed on the London Stock Exchange
Furniture retailers of the United Kingdom
Retail companies established in 1964
Retail companies disestablished in 2008
British companies established in 1964
British companies disestablished in 2008
Companies that have entered administration in the United Kingdom
Defunct companies based in London